HD 3240 is a single star in the northern constellation of Cassiopeia, positioned near Zeta Cassiopeiae. This object has a blue-white hue and is dimly visible to the naked eye with an apparent visual magnitude of 5.08. The distance to HD 3240 is approximately 480 light years based on parallax. At that range, the visual magnitude of the star is diminished by an extinction of 0.22 due to interstellar dust.

This star has a stellar classification of B7 III, matching an aging giant star that has exhausted the supply of hydrogen at its core. It is around 201 million years old and is spinning with a projected rotational velocity of 59 km/s, well below its critical velocity of 335 km/s. The star has 3.9 times the mass of the Sun and is radiating 405 times the Sun's luminosity from its photosphere at an effective temperature of 11,885 K.

References

B-type giants
Cassiopeia (constellation)
Durchmusterung objects
003240
0144
002854